One Day International (ODI) cricket is one of three forms of cricket played at international level. Unlike Test cricket, ODIs consist of one innings per team and is played over the course of single day. Each innings is limited to a maximum of 50 overs, although previously this has been 55 or 60 overs. Matches are played by the twelve teams representing full member nations of the International Cricket Council (ICC), each of with have permanent ODI status, as well the eight Associate members of the ICC that currently have temporary ODI status. Australia played in the inaugural ODI match against England on 5 January 1971 at the Melbourne Cricket Ground. They have played a total of 975 matches, second only to India who have played 1,020. , Australia is the most third-most successful team in ODI cricket with an overall winning percentage of 63.39, behind the ACC Asia XI on 66.66 percent and South Africa on 63.41.

Top order batsman and former captain Ricky Ponting holds several Australian ODI cricket records. Playing between 1995 to 2012, he scored 13,589 runs, making him the only Australian player to score 10,000 ODI runs. He has scored a record 82 half-centuries and 29 centuries. As a slip fielder, Ponting has also taken the most catches for Australia with 159. Captaining his side from 2002 until his retirement in 2012, Ponting holds the ODI record for the most matches played as captain with 230 and the record for the most matches played for Australia with 374.

Fast bowlers Glenn McGrath and Brett Lee share the record for the most ODI wickets taken for Australia with 380. McGrath also holds the record for the best figures taken by an Australian in an ODI match with 7/15 while Lee holds the Australian ODI record for the most five-wicket hauls with nine. Adam Gilchrist is Australia's most successful wicket-keeper having taken 470 dismissals and holds the ODI record for the most catches taken as a wicket-keeper with 417. Gilchrist also holds the Australian record for playing 97 consecutive ODI matches between 1997 and 2001.

Key
The top five records are listed for each category, except for the team wins, losses, ties and no results and the partnership records. Tied records for fifth place are also included. Explanations of the general symbols and cricketing terms used in the list are given below. Specific details are provided in each category where appropriate. All records include matches played for Australia only, and are correct .

Team records

Overall Record 

Note: Tied matches considered as half win.

W/L ratio and win % excluded the matches which ended in No result.

Team wins, losses, ties and no results
, Australia has played 975 ODI matches resulting in 592 victories, 340 defeats, 9 ties and 34 no results for an overall winning percentage of 63.39, the third highest winning percentage of ODI playing teams. Australia has played the second-highest number of ODI matches, behind India who have competed in 1,020. Australia has played matches against 18 of the 27 other ODI teams. They have yet to play against the Africa XI, the ACC Asia XI, Bermuda, East Africa, Hong Kong, Nepal, Oman, Papua New Guinea and the United Arab Emirates. Australia has never lost a match against Afghanistan, Ireland or any of the ICC Associate Members that they have played.

Team scoring records

Most runs in an innings
The highest innings total scored in ODI cricket came in the series between England and the Netherlands in June 2022. Playing in the first ODI at VRA Cricket Ground, Amstelveen the tourists posted a total of 4/498. This broke the record of 6/481 also set by England at Trent Bridge against Australia three years prior. The fifth ODI of the 2005–06 series against South Africa saw Australia set their highest innings total of 4/434, the eighth-highest score in ODI cricket.

Highest successful run chases
South Africa claims the highest successful run chase in ODI cricket when they scored 9/438 chasing a target of 435 runs. This came during the final ODI match of Australia's tour of South Africa in 2005–06 at Wanderers Stadium in Johannesburg. The fourth ODI of the 2018–19 series against India saw Australia achieve their highest successful run chase in the format. Set 359 for victory at Punjab Cricket Association IS Bindra in Mohali, Australia reached the target with 13 balls to spare.

Fewest runs in an innings
The lowest innings total scored in ODI cricket came in the third ODI of Sri Lanka's tour of Zimbabwe in April 2004. Zimbabwe in the first innings was bowled all out for 35 runs. This record was equalled in February 2020 in the final match of the Nepal Tri-Nation Series where the hosts bowled out the United States. Australia's lowest total of 70 has been set twice. The first came during the second ODI against England in 1977 and again eight years later during the 1985–86 Australian Tri-Series against New Zealand.

Result records
A ODI match is won when one side has scored more runs than the total runs scored by the opposing side during their innings. If both sides have completed their allocated innings and the side that fielded last has the higher number of runs, it is known as a win by runs. This indicates the number of runs that they had scored more than the opposing side. If the side batting last wins the match, it is known as a win by wickets, indicating the number of wickets that were still to fall.

Greatest win margins (by runs)

The greatest winning margin by runs in ODI cricket was India's victory over Sri Lanka at the Greenfield International Stadium in Thiruvananthapuram in January 2023 where the hosts won by a margin of 317 runs. This eclipsed New Zealand's victory over Ireland by 290 runs during the 2008 Associates Tri-Series in Scotland. The next largest victory was Australia's defeat of Afghanistan during the 2015 World Cup by 275 runs.

Greatest win margins (by 10 wickets)
Australia have won a ODI match by a margin of 10 wickets on 5 occasions, the most recent being against India in January 2020.

Greatest win margins (by balls remaining)

The group stage of the 1979 World Cup saw England run down the target of 46 runs to defeat Canada by a margin of 8 wickets with 277 balls remaining in the 60-over innings, the largest victory by balls remaining in ODI cricket history. The next largest victory was Sri Lanka's win against Zimbabwe in the opening match of the 2001 LG Abans Triangular Series at the Singhalese Sports Club Cricket Ground in Colombo, where the hosts reached the target of 39 runs with 274 balls to spare. Australia's only ODI match to date against the United States, at the 2004 Champions Trophy, saw the 66-run target achieved by Australia with 253 balls remaining in their innings – the sixth highest overall.

Narrowest win margins (by 1 run)
Thirty-three ODI matches have been won by a margin of one run with Australia having won six of them, the most recent being third ODI against Pakistan at the Zayed Sports City Stadium in Abu Dhabi in October 2014.

Narrowest win margins (by 1 wicket)
Sixty-six ODI matches have been won by a margin of one wicket with Australia having won four of them, the most recent being against England in the second ODI in January 2014 at The Gabba. Set 301 for victory, Australia found themselves at 9/244 with seven overs remaining. However, a man of the match performance from James Faulkner who top scored with 69 not out got Australia home with three ball remaining.

Narrowest win margins (by balls remaining)
Thirty-seven ODI matches have been won on the final ball of the match with Australia having done so on four occasions. The most recent , was against Pakistan during the group stage of the 2009 ICC Champions Trophy. Set 206 runs for victory, the winning run was a bye off the bowling of Umar Gul with Nathan Hauritz and Brett Lee at the crease.

Greatest loss margins (by runs)
The third and final ODI of Sri Lanka's tour of India saw tourists being defeated by 317 runs, the greatest losing margin by runs in ODI cricket. Australia's largest defeat by number of runs came during the third ODI against England at Trent Bridge in 2018, losing by margin of 242 runs.

Greatest loss margins (by wickets)
Australia have lost an ODI match by a margin of 10 wickets on only one occasion – against New Zealand in February 2007. Playing at the Wellington Regional Stadium, Australia was bowled all out for 148 runs in 49.3 overs. In reply, New Zealand reached the target in 27 overs for the loss of no wickets.

Greatest loss margins (by balls remaining)
Canada suffered the greatest defeat in ODI cricket during the 1979 World Cup when England run down the target of 46 runs with 277 balls remaining. The Gabba played host to Australia's worst defeat in January 2013 when Sri Lanka scored the 75 runs required for victory with 180 balls remaining.

Narrowest loss margins (by runs)
Thirty-three ODI matches have been lost by a margin of one run with Australia having lost five of them, the most recent being in February 2004 at the Rangiri Dambulla International Stadium against Sri Lanka.

Narrowest loss margins (by wickets)
ODI cricket has seen sixty-six matches been decided by a margin of one wicket, with Australia being defeated in seven of them. The most recent was final ODI of the five-match series against England at Old Trafford in June 2018. England run down the modest total of 206 runs with nine balls remaining to secure a 5–0 series victory – the first time that Australia had been whitewashed in a five-match ODI series against England.

Narrowest loss margins (by balls remaining)
Thirty-seven ODI matches have been lost on the final ball of the match. The first ODI of the 2008–09 Chappell–Hadlee Trophy series at the WACA has been the only occasion where Australia has lost an ODI match with zero balls remaining. Posting 181, New Zealand ran down the total and won by the match with two wickets in hand.

Tied matches

A tie can occur when the scores of both teams are equal at the conclusion of play, provided that the side batting last has completed their innings. , there have made 42 matches have ended in a tie in ODI cricket history, with nine involving Australia. The most recent match was against the West Indies at the Arnos Vale Stadium in March 2012. The West Indies required one run for victory from the final three deliveries of the bowling of Brett Lee, but when the captain Daren Sammy was run out this left both teams unable to be split with 220 runs each.

There was one match involving Australia when a tie-breaker was used after the scores were level. In the only ODI match played against Pakistan during the 1988–89 tour, both teams finished with 229 runs in the 45-over match. Pakistan was declared winner though due to loss of one fewer wicket.

Individual records

Batting records

Most career runs
A run is the basic means of scoring in cricket.
            
India's Sachin Tendulkar has scored the most runs in ODI cricket with 18,426. Second is Kumar Sangakkara of Sri Lanka with 14,234 ahead of Ricky Ponting from Australia in third with 13,704. No other Australian batsmen has scored more than 10,000 runs in ODI cricket.

Highest individual score

The fourth ODI of the 2014–15 series contested between India and Sri Lanka, at the Eden Gardens in Kolkata saw Rohit Sharma of India set the highest individual ODI innings score with 264. Four months later during the quarter finals of the 2015 Cricket World Cup, New Zealand's Martin Guptill posted the second highest individual ODI innings score of 237 not out against the West Indies at Wellington Regional Stadium. Shane Watson holds the Australian record with his score of 185 not out coming against Bangladesh in 2011, surpassing the 181 not out set by Matthew Hayden at Seddon Park in Hamilton during the final ODI of the 2006–07 Chappell–Hadlee Trophy. David Warner has made four of Australia's ten highest ODI individual scores, with his best of 179 coming against Pakistan at Adelaide Oval on Australia Day 2017.

Highest career average
A batsman's batting average is the total number of runs they have scored divided by the number of times they have been dismissed.

South Africa opening batsman Rassie van der Dussen currently holds the record for the highest career average in ODI cricket with 69.31, . The Netherlands' Ryan ten Doeschate, finished his ODI career with an average of 67.00. The next two are the currently active players Babar Azam of Pakistan and the former Indian captain Virat Kohli with averages of 59.79 and 58.23, respectively. Australia's Michael Bevan has the fifth-best career average in ODI cricket with 53.58.

Highest career strike rate

A batsman's strike rate is the average number of runs scored per 100 balls faced.

, the batsman with three highest strike rates are all current players. Andre Russell of the West Indies tops the list with 130.22. Australia's Glenn Maxwell follows with 124.98 and Jos Buttler of England with rate of 119.04 is third. James Faulkner is the only other Australian with an ODI batting strike rate of above 100.

Most half-centuries
A half-century is a score of between 50 and 99 runs. Statistically, once a batsman's score reaches 100, it is no longer considered a half-century but a century.

Sachin Tendulkar of India has scored the most half-centuries in ODI cricket with 96. He is followed by Sri Lanka's Kumar Sangakkara on 93, South Africa's Jacques Kallis on 86, India's Rahul Dravid and Inzamam-ul-Haq of Pakistan 83 and in sixth with 82 fifties to his name, Australia's Ricky Ponting.

Most centuries
A century is a score of 100 or more runs in a single innings.

Tendulkar has also scored the most centuries in ODI cricket with 49. , Virat Kohli, the former Indian captain is next on 46 and Ricky Ponting with 30 hundreds is in third.

Most runs in a bilateral series

The 6-match series between India and South Africa in February 2018 saw the touring captain Virat Kohli set the record for the most runs scored in a bilateral ODI series, with 558 runs. Five months later, Pakistan's Fakhar Zaman scored 515 runs on tour during the 5-match series against Zimbabwe. Australia's tour of India in October 2013 saw India's Rohit Sharma score a total of 491 runs and Australian captain George Bailey finish with 478 runs to his name from the 6-match series.

Most ducks
A duck refers to a batsman being dismissed without scoring a run. Sanath Jayasuriya of Sri Lanka has scored the most number of ducks in ODI cricket with 34 ahead of Pakistan's Shahid Afridi with 30. Former Australian captain Ricky Ponting leads the list of Australians with 20 followed by Adam Gilchrist who failed score a run in an ODI innings on 19 occasions.

Bowling records

Most career wickets
A bowler takes the wicket of a batsman when the form of dismissal is bowled, caught, leg before wicket, stumped or hit wicket. If the batsman is dismissed by run out, obstructing the field, handling the ball, hitting the ball twice or timed out the bowler does not receive credit.

Pakistan's Wasim Akram held the record for the most ODI wickets with 502 until February 2009 when Sri Lankan bowler Muttiah Muralitharan passed Akram's milestone. Muralitharan, who continued to play until 2011, finished with 534 wickets to his name. Pakistan's Waqar Younis is third on the list taking 416 wickets. Glenn McGrath of Australia is seventh on the list with 381 ODI wickets one ahead of his compatriot Brett Lee who finished his career with 380.

Best figures in an innings
Bowling figures refers to the number of the wickets a bowler has taken and the number of runs conceded.

No bowler in the history of ODI cricket has taken all 10 wickets in an innings. The closest to do so was Sri Lankan fast bowler Chaminda Vaas. In the opening match of the 2001 LG Abans Triangular Series between Sri Lanka and Zimbabwe at the Singhalese Sports Club Cricket Ground in Colombo, Vaas took 8/19. Pakistani Shahid Afridi, who returned figured of 7/12 against the West Indies at Providence Stadium in Guyana in July 2013, sits behind Vaas. Australia's undefeated run during the 2003 Cricket World Cup saw Glenn McGrath take 7/15 against in Namibia and Andy Bichel 7/20 against England for the third and fifth best in ODI history. These performances broke the long standing Australian record of Gary Gilmour's 6/14 set during the semi final of 1975 Cricket World Cup against England.

Best career average

A bowler's bowling average is the total number of runs they have conceded divided by the number of wickets they have taken.

Nepalese leg spinner Sandeep Lamichhane holds the record for the best career average in ODI cricket with 15.57, . He is followed the Namibian off spiner Bernard Scholtz on 18.52 and by fellow leg spinner Rashid Khan of Afghanistan on 18.55. Australia's Ryan Harris finished his career with the fifth best ODI bowling average of 18.90 runs per wicket.

Best career economy rate
A bowler's economy rate is the total number of runs they have conceded divided by the number of overs they have bowled.

West Indian bowler Joel Garner holds the ODI record for the best career economy rate with 3.09. Australia's Max Walker, with a rate of 3.25 runs per over conceded over his 17-match ODI career, is second on the list.

Best career strike rate
A bowler's strike rate is the total number of balls they have bowled divided by the number of wickets they have taken.

The currently active Nepalese spin bowler Sandeep Lamichhane holds the record for the best career strike rate in the ODI format with 23.2, narrowly ahead of Australia's Ryan Harris who retired with a rate of 23.4. Fellow Australian Mitchell Starc, is currently sixth on the list, with rate of 26.1 deliveries per wicket.

Most five-wicket hauls in an innings

A five-wicket haul refers to a bowler taking five wickets in a single innings.

Pakistani Waqar Younis has taken the most the five-wicket hauls in ODI cricket with 13 ahead of Sri Lanka's Muttiah Muralitharan with 10. Australia's Brett Lee who took 9 five-wicket hauls throughout his career, is equal third with Shahid Afridi of Pakistan.

Worst figures in an innings
The fifth ODI of the 2005–06 series between Australia and South Africa at Wanderers Stadium in Johannesburg saw many records set including the worst figures ever recorded in an innings in ODI cricket. Australia's Mick Lewis, playing in his seventh and subsequent final match, returned figures of 0/113 from his 10 overs in the second innings of the match. During the ODI series in 2018 where England whitewashed Australia 5–0, Australia recorded their second and fourth worst individual bowling performances. The third ODI at the Trent Bridge saw Andrew Tye and Marcus Stoinis return figures of 0/100 and 0/85, respectively.

Most wickets in a bilateral series

The seven-match ODI series between India and New Zealand in 2002–03 saw the record set for the most wickets taken by a bowler in an ODI bilateral series. Indian paceman Javagal Srinath achieved a total of 18 wickets to his name. His compatriot Amit Mishra equalled this feat during the five-match 2013 Indian ODI tour of Zimbabwe. Three Australians have taken 14 wickets an ODI bilateral series with Pat Cummins the latest to do so during the 2018–19 home series against India.

Wicket-keeping records
The wicket-keeper is a specialist fielder who stands behind the stumps being guarded by the batsman on strike and is the only member of the fielding side allowed to wear gloves and leg pads.

Most career dismissals
A wicket-keeper can be credited with the dismissal of a batsman in two ways, caught or stumped. A fair catch is taken when the ball is caught fully within the field of play without it bouncing after the ball has touched the striker's bat or glove holding the bat, while a stumping occurs when the wicket-keeper puts down the wicket while the batsman is out of his ground and not attempting a run.

Australia's Adam Gilchrist is second only Sri Lanka's Kumar Sangakkara is taking most dismissals in ODI cricket as a designated wicket-keeper, with Sangakkara taking 482 to Gilchrist 472.

Most career catches

Adam Gilchrist has taken the most number of catches as a designated wicket-keeper in ODI cricket with 417. He sits ahead of South Africa's Mark Boucher and Sangakkara on 402 and 383, respectively.

Most career stumpings
Indian glovemen MS Dhoni with 123 holds the record for the most stumpings in ODI cricket. He is followed by Sangakkara with 99 to his name. Gilchrist is fifth on the list with 55.

Most dismissals in an innings
Adam Gilchrist became the first wicket-keeper to take six dismissals in an ODI innings, setting this record against South Africa at Newlands Cricket Ground in April 2000. Since then a further nine glovemen have matched this feat on a single occasion with Gilchrist achieving it five more times. Pakistan's Sarfaraz Ahmed was the most recent wicket-keeper to achieve the milestone, taking six dismissals against South Africa during 2015 World Cup.

Most dismissals in a bilateral series

The ODI cricket record for the most dismissals taken by a wicket-keeper in a bilateral series is held by Brendon McCullum of New Zealand with 19 taken during the seven-match 2002–03 series against India. He sits ahead of Brad Haddin who during the five-match ODI series against Pakistan in 2009–10 took 17.

Fielding records

Most career catches
Caught is one of the nine methods a batsman can be dismissed in cricket. A fair catch is defined as a fielder catching the ball, from a legal delivery, fully within the field of play without it bouncing when the ball has touched the striker's bat or glove holding the bat. The majority of catches are caught in the slips, located behind the batsman, next to the wicket-keeper, on the off side of the field. Most slip fielders are top order batsmen.

Sri Lanka's Mahela Jayawardene holds the record for the most catches in ODI cricket by a non-wicket-keeper with 218. He is followed former Australian captain Ricky Ponting who secured 160 catches in his ODI career.

Most catches in a bilateral series
The seven-match 2002–03 series between New Zealand and India saw the record set for the most catches taken by a non-wicket-keeper in a ODI series with New Zealand captain Stephen Fleming taking 10 catches. South African Jacques Kallis and the West Indies' Kieron Pollard are equal second behind Fleming with nine. Both George Bailey and Aaron Finch leads the list of the Australians with seven catches taken during the 2011–12 tour of the West Indies and the 2012–13 home series against the West Indies, respectively.

Other records

Most career matches
India's Sachin Tendulkar holds the record for the most ODI matches played with 463, followed by the Sri Lankan pair of Mahela Jayawardene with 448 and Sanath Jayasuriya with 445. Former captain Ricky Ponting is the most capped Australian having represented his country on 374 occasions.

Most consecutive career matches
India's Sachin Tendulkar holds the record for the most consecutive ODI matches played with 185. Andy Flower of Zimbabwe is second with 172 and South African Hansie Cronje with 162 is third. Adam Gilchrist with 97 consecutive matches is the highest ranked Australian player. Flower's run of 172 matches is the highest from ODI debut with Steve Waugh's 87 consecutive matches also starting since his debut in 1986.

Most matches as captain

Ricky Ponting, who led the Australian cricket team from 2002 to 2012, holds the record for the most matches played as captain in ODI cricket with 230. Stephen Fleming, who skippered New Zealand from 1997 to 2007 is second with 218 matches. India's captain from 2007 to 2018, MS Dhoni, is third on the list with 200. In fifth on 178 is Australia's Allan Border who led the side for ten years from 1985 to 1994.

Youngest players

The youngest player to play in an ODI match is claimed to be Hasan Raza at the age of 14 years and 233 days. Making his debut for Pakistan against Zimbabwe on 30 October 1996, there is some doubt as to the validity of Raza's age at the time. The youngest Australian to play ODI cricket was Pat Cummins who at the age of 18 years and 164 days debuted in the first ODI of the series against South Africa in October 2011 eclipsing the record that Josh Hazlewood had set against England 16 months earlier.

Oldest players on debut

At 47 years and 240 days, Nolan Clarke, playing for the Netherlands in 1996 Cricket World Cup, is the oldest player to make his debut in ODI cricket. World Series Cricket resulted in Bob Simpson coming out of retirement to lead Australia on a tour of the West Indies in 1978. The first ODI match was played prior to the Test series where he made his debut in the format aged 42 years and 19 days, the oldest Australian to do so.

Oldest players
The Netherlands' fifth and final match in the 1996 Cricket World Cup saw Nolan Clarke set the record for the oldest player to appear in an ODI match at 47 years and 257 days. The oldest Australian cricketer to play in the international format is Bob Simpson. As above, Simpson was called lead the national side for the 1978 West Indies tour. The second ODI following the Test series, was his second and final ODI match where aged 42 years and 68 days he led Australia to victory.

Partnership records

In cricket, two batsmen are always present at the crease batting together in a partnership. This partnership will continue until one of them is dismissed, retires or the innings comes to a close.

Highest partnerships by wicket
A wicket partnership describes the number of runs scored before each wicket falls. The first wicket partnership is between the opening batsmen and continues until the first wicket falls. The second wicket partnership then commences between the not out batsman and the number three batsman. This partnership continues until the second wicket falls. The third wicket partnership then commences between the not out batsman and the new batsman. This continues down to the tenth wicket partnership. When the tenth wicket has fallen, there is no batsman left to partner so the innings is closed.

Australian batsmen current don't hold any ODI wicket partnerships records, . However, the eighth wicket partnership of 119 by the pairing of Paul Reiffel and Shane Warne in 1994 against South Africa was an ODI wicket partnership record at the time of posting.

Highest partnerships by runs
The highest ODI partnership by runs for any wicket is held by the West Indian pairing of Chris Gayle and Marlon Samuels who put together a second wicket partnership of 372 runs during the 2015 Cricket World Cup against Zimbabwe. Fellow West Indians John Campbell and Shai Hope sit in second with their 365 for the opening stand against Ireland in 2019. India's Sachin Tendulkar and Rahul Dravid hold the third-highest ODI partnership with 331 made in 1999 against New Zealand. The final ODI against Pakistan in 2017 saw openers David Warner and Travis Head make 284, Australia's highest ODI partnership.

Umpiring records

Most matches umpired
An umpire in cricket is a person who officiates the match according to the Laws of Cricket. Two umpires adjudicate the match on the field, whilst a third umpire has access to video replays, and a fourth umpire looks after the match balls and other duties. The records below are only for on-field umpires.

Aleem Dar of Pakistan holds the record for the most ODI matches umpired with 219, . The current active Dar set the record in November 2020 overtaking Rudi Koertzen from South Africa mark of 209. They are followed by New Zealand's Billy Bowden who has officiated in 200. The most experienced Australians are Daryl Harper and Simon Taufel who are equal fifth on the list with each having umpired 174 ODI matches.

Notes

References

ODI
Australia